Olu Akenjoye was the 11th Olu of Warri who ruled over the Itsekiri and non Itsekiri people in the kingdom. He was the son to Olu Abejoye, the 10th Olu of Warri Kingdom. He succeeded his father as the 11th Olu of Warri. He took the title, Ogiame Sebastian II. He was succeeded by his son Olu Omagboye (Miguel).

References

Nigerian traditional rulers
People from Warri
Year of birth unknown
Year of death unknown